The 1974 Alabama Crimson Tide football team (variously "Alabama", "UA" or "Bama") represented the University of Alabama in the 1974 NCAA Division I football season. It was the Crimson Tide's 80th overall and 41st season as a member of the Southeastern Conference (SEC). The team was led by head coach Bear Bryant, in his 17th year, and played their home games at Denny Stadium in Tuscaloosa and Legion Field in Birmingham, Alabama. They finished season with eleven wins and one loss (11–1 overall, 6–0 in the SEC), as SEC champions and with a loss to Notre Dame in the Orange Bowl.

As they entered the 1974 season, the Crimson Tide were one of the favorites to compete for the national championship. In their first game of the season, Alabama narrowly escaped with a win at Maryland in what was Bryant's first visit to College Park since he resigned as the Terrapins' head coach after their 1945 season. They followed with victories over Southern Miss, Vanderbilt and Ole Miss before they played in their closest game of the season against Florida State. Although the Crimson Tide entered their contest against the 0-4 Seminoles as a heavy favorite, they trailed for nearly the entire game until Bucky Berrey connected on the game-winning field goal from 36-yards out with only 0:33 left in the game. It was the closest Florida State would come to victory until scoring their only win at Miami in their ninth game to break a 20-game losing streak dating back to 1972.

In their next game, Alabama defeated rival Tennessee. After the Vols scored on a second quarter touchdown run, the Crimson Tide defense did not surrender another for 17 consecutive quarters against TCU, Mississippi State, LSU, and Miami. Alabama then closed the season with an Iron Bowl victory over Auburn, but then failed to capture the national championship after they lost to Notre Dame in the Orange Bowl. The loss extended their winless streak in bowl games to eight , which ended the following year.

Schedule

Source: Rolltide.com: 1974 Alabama football schedule

Game summaries

Maryland

Sources:

As they entered their first game of the 1974 season, Alabama was ranked as the USA's No. 3 team and Maryland as the No. 14 team in the AP Poll. Before what was then the largest crowd to ever attend a college football game in the state of Maryland, the Crimson Tide entered the game as a two-touchdown favorite, but struggled to a 21–16 win over the Terrapins. Alabama took a 14–0 lead in the second quarter behind a pair of Calvin Culliver touchdown runs. He scored one in each of the first two quarter with the first from seven and the second from 73-yards. The Terrapins responded with a pair of Steve Mike-Mayer field goals from 32 and 35-yards in the second and one from 40-yards in the third that cut the lead to 14–9.

After Richard Todd extended the Crimson Tide lead to 21–9 with his one-yard touchdown run in the third, Louis Carter made the final score 21–16 with his one-yard touchdown run for Maryland in the fourth. This game also marked the first for coach Bryant at College Park since he resigned as the Terrapins' head coach after their 1945 season. For his two touchdown, 169 yard performance, Culliver was recognized as the AP Southeastern Back of the Week. The victory improved Alabama's all-time record against Maryland to 2–1.

Southern Miss

Sources:

After their closer than expected victory over Maryland, Alabama dropped into the No. 5 position of the AP Poll prior to their game against Southern Miss. Against the Golden Eagles the Crimson Tide amassed 643 yards of total offense en route to this 52–0 victory at Legion Field. Alabama took a 7–0 first quarter lead on an 11-yard Richard Todd touchdown run. They then extended it to 21–0 at halftime behind a 42-yard Todd touchdown pass to Russ Schamun and a five-yard Randy Billingsley touchdown run.

A 30-yard Jack O'Rear touchdown run in the third made the score 28–0 as they entered the fourth quarter. In the final period, Danny Ridgeway connected on a 27-yard field goal and touchdowns were scored on runs of 25, 11 and 50-yards by Ralph Stokes, Rick Watson and John Boles respectively. The victory improved Alabama's all-time record against Southern Miss to 14–2–1.

Vanderbilt

Sources:

After their victory over Southern Miss, Alabama moved into the No. 4 position in the AP Poll prior to their game against Vanderbilt. Against the Commodores, Vanderbilt kept it close, but ultimately fell to the Crimson Tide 23–10 in the first Tuscaloosa game of the season. After Calvin Culliver gave Alabama a 7–0 lead with his 85-yard touchdown run, Mark Adams connected on a 20-yard field goal for Vanderbilt that made the score 7–3 at the end of the first quarter. A 36-yard Bucky Berrey field goal in the second quarter gave the Crimson Tide a 10–3 halftime lead.

In the third, Richard Todd threw a 14-yard touchdown pass to Russ Schamun and Berrey connected on a 42-yard field goal that made the score 20–3 as the teams entered the final quarter. In the fourth, Danny Ridgeway connected on a 27-yard field goal for Alabama and Fred Fisher threw a 26-yard touchdown pass to Walter Overton for the Commodores that made the final score 23–10.  The victory improved Alabama's all-time record against Vanderbilt to 31–17–4.

Ole Miss

Sources:

After their victory over Vanderbilt, Alabama moved into the No. 3 position in the AP Poll prior to their game against Ole Miss. Playing before a televised audience, the Crimson Tide defeated the Rebels 35–21 at Jackson. Alabama took an early 7–0 lead on a three-yard James Taylor run in the first quarter. After the Rebels tied the game 7–7 on a nine-yard Kenneth Lyons touchdown run in the second, the Crimson Tide responded with a three-yard Willie Shelby touchdown run for a 14–7 halftime lead.

In the third, Ole Miss briefly took a 21–14 lead after touchdowns were scored on a one-yard Lyons run and a 42-yard Gary Turner interception return. Alabama responded with a pair of third quarter touchdowns of their own on runs of 58-yards by Shelby and eight-yards by Rick Watson. A one-yard Richard Todd touchdown run in the fourth quarter made the final score 35–21. The victory improved Alabama's all-time record against Ole Miss to 23–5–2.

Florida State

Sources:

After their victory over Ole Miss, Alabama retained their No. 3 position in the AP Poll prior to their game against Florida State.
Against the Seminoles, the Crimson Tide trailed until the final minute of regulation when Bucky Berrey converted the game-winning field goal for the 8–7 victory. The Seminoles took the opening kickoff and drove 78-yards on nine plays for a 7–0 lead behind a six-yard Larry Key touchdown run.

Florida State continued to hold their touchdown lead through the third quarter when the Crimson Tide scored their first points on a 44-yard Berrey field goal. With just 1:27 left in the game, Seminoles head coach Darrell Mudra elected to take an intentional safety instead of attempting a punt out of the endzone. He made this decision as Alabama had been close on a couple of previous attempts to block punts during the game, and did not want a block to occur in the endzone. Down now 7–5, the Crimson Tide drove into field goal territory and Berrey hit the game winner from 36-yards out with only 0:33 left in the game. The victory improved Alabama's all-time record against Florida State to 2–0–1.

Tennessee

Sources:

After their closer than expected victory over Florida State, Alabama dropped into the No. 4 position prior to their game at Tennessee. Both Willie Shelby and Calvin Culliver each scored a pair of touchdowns for the Crimson Tide in this 28–6 victory over the Volunteers. After a scoreless first, Alabama took a 7–0 on a 13-yard touchdown run by Willie Shelby in the second quarter. Tennessee responded with their only points on a 64-yard Stanley Morgan touchdown run and made the halftime score 7–6.

The Crimson Tide extended their lead to 21–6 at the end of the third behind touchdown runs of 19-yards by Shelby and 30-yards by Calvin Culliver. Culliver then scored the final points of the game with his six-yard touchdown run that made the final score 28–6. The victory improved Alabama's all-time record against Tennessee to 27–23–7.

TCU

Sources:

After their victory over Tennessee, Alabama retained their No. 4 position prior to their out of conference match-up against Texas Christian University (TCU) at Legion Field.
Against the Horned Frogs of the Southwest Conference, Alabama won 41–3 for their first all-time victory over TCU. The Crimson Tide took a 14–0 lead in the first quarter behind touchdown runs of four and one-yard by Robert Fraley and Rick Watson before TCU scored their only points on a 30-yard Tony Biasatti field goal in the second. Alabama responded with a five-yard Robert Fraley touchdown pass to George Pugh just prior to the break that made the score 21–3 at halftime.

The Crimson Tide continued their scoring with three second half touchdowns en route to their 41–3 victory. Ozzie Newsome scored on a 15-yard Fraley pass in the third and Jack O'Rear threw a 15-yard touchdown pass to Jerry Brown and scored on a 21-yard run in the fourth. The victory improved Alabama's all-time record against TCU to 1–3.

Mississippi State

Sources:

As they entered their game against Mississippi State, Alabama retained their No. 4 position in the AP Poll and the Bulldogs were in the No. 17 position. On homecoming and before what was then the largest crowd in the history of Denny Stadium, the Crimson Tide shutout Mississippi State 35–0 for the second consecutive season. Alabama took a 6–0 first quarter lead behind a one-yard Robert Fraley touchdown run. They then extended it to 19–0 at halftime behind touchdown runs of one-yard by Calvin Culliver and two-yards by Richard Todd.

After a scoreless third, the Crimson Tide closed the game with 16 fourth quarter points for the 35–0 win. Touchdowns were scored in the final period on runs of seven-yards by Randy Billingsley and five-yards by Ray Sewell with a 42-yard Bucky Berrey field goal providing for the final margin. The victory improved Alabama's all-time record against Mississippi State to 46–10–3.

LSU

Sources:

After their victory over Mississippi State, Alabama moved into the No. 3 position in the AP Poll prior to their nationally televised game against LSU. With their 30–0 victory over the rival Tigers, the Crimson Tide secured both a share of the 1974 conference championship and a place in the Orange Bowl.

Alabama took a 7–0 first quarter lead behind a one-yard Calvin Culliver touchdown run. They extended it further to 23–0 at halftime after points were scored on a 20-yard Danny Ridgeway field goal, a 29-yard Ricky Davis fumble return and on a three-yard Richard Todd touchdown run. After a scoreless third, the Crimson Tide closed with a two-yard Jack O'Rear touchdown run in the fourth for the 30–0 win. For their performances, Willie Shelby was recognized as the SEC Back of the Week and Leroy Cook was recognized as the SEC Lineman of the Week. The victory improved Alabama's all-time record against LSU to 24–10–4.

Miami

Sources:

As they entered their game against Miami, Alabama moved into the No. 2 position in the AP Poll. Before a relatively small crowd, Alabama defeated the Hurricanes 28–7 and secured Bryant's 150th victory as head coach of the Crimson Tide. The Crimson Tide opened the game with a pair of eight-yard Richard Todd touchdown passes to George Pugh and Jerry Brown for a 14–0 lead. They then extended their lead to 21–0 at halftime behind a 12-yard Gary Rutledge touchdown run in the second quarter.

After a scoreless third, Miami scored their only points on a one-yard Johnny Williams touchdown run in the fourth that marked the first touchdown scored against the Crimson Tide defense in 17 quarters. Alabama responded with a 62-yard Willie Shelby punt return late in the fourth that made the final score 28–7. The victory improved Alabama's all-time record against Miami to 11–2.

Auburn

Sources:

As they entered the annual Iron Bowl, Alabama retained the No. 2 position and Auburn the No. 7 in the AP Poll prior to their match-up at Legion Field. Against the Tigers, the Crimson Tide were victorious as they edged out a 17–13 win at Birmingham. Alabama scored on a 45-yard Richard Todd touchdown pass to Willie Shelby in the first and on a 36-yard Bucky Berrey field goal in the second for a 10–0 lead. Auburn responded with a one-yard Secdrick McIntyre touchdown run late in the second that made the halftime score 10–7.

The Crimson Tide extended their lead to 17–7 early in the third with their only second half points on a 13-yard Calvin Culliver touchdown run. The Tigers then brought the final margin to 17–13 with a two-yard Phil Gargis touchdown run in the fourth. The victory improved Alabama's all-time record against Auburn to 21–17–1.

Notre Dame

Sources:

Playing for what would have been a second consecutive national championship against Notre Dame, Alabama was upset by the Fighting Irish 13–11 in the Orange Bowl. Notre Dame took a 13–0 lead behind touchdown runs of four-yards by Wayne Bullock in the first and nine-yards by Mark McLane in the second quarter. A 21-yard Danny Ridgeway field goal for Alabama made the halftime score 13–3. After a scoreless third, the Crimson Tide scored the final points of the game on a 48-yard Richard Todd touchdown pass to Russ Schamun that made the final score 13–11. The loss brought Alabama's all-time record against Notre Dame to 0–2.

Roster

NFL Draft
Several players that were varsity lettermen from the 1974 squad were drafted into the National Football League (NFL) in the 1975, 1976 and 1977 drafts. These players included:

References
General

 
 

Specific

Alabama
Alabama Crimson Tide football seasons
Southeastern Conference football champion seasons
Alabama Crimson Tide football